Mausoleum of Croatian Kings was a resting place of Croatian medieval rulers in Church of St. Stephen in Solin, Croatia.

History 
According to writings of 13th century medieval chronicler, Thomas the Archdeacon, the Church of St. Stephen was built by queen Helen of Zadar, who then donated them to diocese of Split. Thomas claims, that the churches were temporarily given to some monks who there performed their rituals, due to the royal tombs being inside, until king Zvonimir of Croatia donated them back to the diocese of Split. Thomas noted on:  "that's where magnificent man king Krešimir rests, along with many other kings and queens in atrium of basilica of St. Stephen".Although this area was affected by the Mongol invasions of 13th century, who chased Hungarian king Bela IV all the way to Dalmatia and besieged the nearby Klis fortress, most Croatian scholars nowadays agree that the church of St. Stephen survived these invasions, since it is still visible on 14th century maps. They presume, however, that it was destroyed somewhere in early 16th century, during the Ottoman invasions.

Archeological excavations 
During the construction of a new bell tower in the late 19th century, construction engineers, recognised the remains of some old church walls and invited archeologists to conduct the archeological research of these remains. The research led by Frane Bulić was conducted during the summer of 1898 and as a result of it, fragmented and burnt remains of an epitaph were found. After more than 90 fragments were recovered, Bulić and his team had them reconstructed and got the following inscription: 
 In this tomb rests queen Helen, servant of God, wife of king Michael, mother of king Stephen [...] On the eight day, month of October, she was burried here, 976th year after ascention of Lord [...] She, who was during her life a mother of Kingdom, became (the mother) of poor and protector of widows. By looking here, say thou man: God, give mercy to her soul!"

References 

Mausoleums
Former capitals of Croatia
Archaeological sites in Croatia
Buildings and structures in Split-Dalmatia County